Boulder Lake is located in the Olympic National Park in Washington.  It is accessible by the Olympic Hot Springs Trail and the Appleton Pass trail.  The hike is about  round trip and has about a  elevation gain.  At the lake there are a few camp sites and a bear wire to hang food.  The lake lies at the base of Boulder Peak.

External links 

Lakes of Clallam County, Washington
Lakes of Washington (state)
Landforms of Olympic National Park